The 1956–57 Rugby Union County Championship was the 57th edition of England's premier rugby union club competition at the time.

Devon won the competition for the seventh time (but first since 1912) after defeating Yorkshire in the final.

Final

See also
 English rugby union system
 Rugby union in England

References

Rugby Union County Championship
County Championship (rugby union) seasons